Edward Asare (born 10 July 1993) is Ghanaian blogger, Influencer, and a digital marketer. He was nominated among the Top 50 Ghanaian Bloggers in 2021 by Avance Media and was awarded Ghana's Digital Marketing Professional of the Year by the National Communication Awards in 2021.

Early life 
Edward Asare was born at Dawatrim-Asesewa in the Eastern region (Upper Manya Krobo District) to Rev. Eric  N. Asare and Mary Asare.

Education 
Edward attended Dawatrim R/C primary school and then continued his elementary education at the De Youngsters International school. His senior high school education was at Accra Academy from where he continued to the University of Ghana where he read Economics and Information Studies.

Career 
In 2016, Edward Asare worked as a social media manager at TV3 and did his national service at St. Francis Girls' Senior High School. He has worked with Genesis International Ltd, Glofert Ghana, Peduase Valley Resort, Media General Ltd, Ankobrah Beach Resort, Redpear and Yen.com.gh. Mr. Asare is currently a Digital Marketer with United Bank for Africa, Ghana, and a board member of Educational World Wide.

Awards and recognitions

References

External links
 Official website

1993 births
Living people
University of Ghana alumni
Ghanaian bloggers